The Welsh National PGA Championship is a golf tournament played annually in Wales since 1904. For many years the event was called the Welsh Professional Championship. Currently entry is restricted to professionals employed by a Welsh club and those born in Wales or with a parent or grandparent born in Wales. 2016 was the 100th edition of the event and was won by Lydia Hall after a final round 67.

History
The first Championship was held at Radyr Golf Club on 15 July 1904. It was a 36-hole stroke-play event played on a single day. There were 19 entries. Tom Brace led after a 79 in the morning but fell away after an afternoon 92. The winner was the Tenby professional, Arthur Day, who had rounds of 81 and 80 for a total of 161. This put him three strokes ahead of the joint runners-up, 20-year-old George Duncan and Bill Leaver, who had finished 8th in the 1903 Open Championship. The winner received 10 guineas and a gold medal.

The 1905 Championship was held at Conwy Golf Club on 23 August 1905. There were 15 entries. The winner also received entry to the final stage of the News of the World Matchplay. The winner was the Llandudno professional Fred Collins on 153. Collins finished two shots ahead of George Duncan. However, Duncan had moved to Timperley and was only trying to qualify for the News of the World Matchplay, not being eligible for the Welsh Championship. Alfred Matthews, the Rhyl professional, was runner-up in the Championship on 160. The News of the World Matchplay had started in 1903 but in the first two years the Welsh professionals had had to play in the Northern or Midland sections qualifying events.

In 1971 the event was held as part of the Welsh Professional Open Championship. Don Gammon won the open event with a score of 278, a stroke ahead of Stuart Brown. Two golfers tied for the closed event, Jimmy Buckley and Kim Dabson both scoring 291. Buckley won a sudden-death playoff at the second extra hole.

Winners
Source:

+ reduced to 54 holes.
++ reduced to 18 holes.
+++ reduced to 36 holes.

References

External links
Welsh National PGA Championship official site

Golf tournaments in Wales
Recurring sporting events established in 1904